"All Bad Things Must End" (commonly known as "All Bad Things") is a song by American band Mötley Crüe, released as a single in January 2015. The song is about the internal forces threatening the band, and its intro features Nikki Sixx stating that the band "would rather just break up than be bland".

"We haven't ruled out the idea of a new album," Sixx said at the time. "We're proud of the songs 'Sex', 'Sick Love Song', 'All Bad Things'…"

Music video

The song's video features clips of music videos, live footage, backstage footage, and other footage from the band since 1981. Nudity (including male nudity, albeit covered with a censor box) is shown, but a clean version is available. It also features the covers for all Crüe albums, except for their self-titled 1994 release, due to the absence of Vince Neil. However, it still includes the cover of 2000's New Tattoo, despite the absence of Tommy Lee.

Personnel

Members

Vince Neil - vocals
Mick Mars - guitars 
Nikki Sixx - bass
Tommy Lee - drums

Lyrics

Nikki Sixx - composition
Mick Mars - composition
Tommy Lee - composition
James Michael - composition

Charts

References

2015 singles
Mötley Crüe songs
2015 songs
Songs written by Nikki Sixx
Songs written by Mick Mars
Songs written by James Michael
Songs written by Tommy Lee
Song recordings produced by Bob Rock